This is a list of Daktari episodes (1966–69) in the order in which they were released.

Series overview

Episodes

Season 1 (1966)

Season 2 (1966–67)

Season 3 (1967–68)

Season 4 (1968–69)

External links  
 
 Daktari Episode Guide

Daktari
Daktari